Ignacio Nicolás Lemmo Gervasio (born 13 January 1990) is an Uruguayan footballer who currently plays for Primera B de Chile side Deportes Puerto Montt.

References 
 Profile at BDFA 
 

1990 births
Living people
Footballers from Montevideo
Uruguayan footballers
Uruguayan expatriate footballers
Miramar Misiones players
C.A. Bella Vista players
Canadian Soccer Club players
C.A. Progreso players
Puerto Montt footballers
Unión Española footballers
Primera B de Chile players
Chilean Primera División players
Expatriate footballers in Chile

Association football midfielders